Shiksha is a 1971 Indian Malayalam film, directed by N. Prakash and produced by M. Azim. The film stars Prem Nazir, Sathyan, Sheela and Kaviyoor Ponnamma in the lead roles. The film had musical score by G. Devarajan.

Cast

Prem Nazir as Shiva Sankaran 
Sathyan as Surendran
Sheela as Shobha
Kaviyoor Ponnamma as Meenakshi
Adoor Bhasi as Krishna Pilla
T. R. Omana as Thankamma
T. S. Muthaiah as Ramunni Menon
K. P. Ummer as Prabha
Sadhana as Jayamala
Vijayachandrika as Dancer
Vijayasree as Dancer
N. Govindankutty as Prathapan
Paravoor Bharathan as Pankan Pilla

Soundtrack
The music was composed by G. Devarajan and the lyrics were written by Vayalar Ramavarma.

References

External links
 

1971 films
1970s Malayalam-language films